Abderrahman Kabous (born 24 April 1983) is a football midfielder who is currently at MC Oujda. Born in France, he represented Morocco at international level.

Career
Murcia acquired Kabous from the Bulgarian club PFC CSKA Sofia on 31 January 2008. He has previously also played in Morocco, France and Sweden. In October 2009, he became a free agent, having been released by the Spanish club Real Murcia. On 30 March 2010, the Danish Superliga side Silkeborg IF signed the midfielder on a free transfer.

International career
Born in Meaux, France,  Kabous hold both holds Moroccan and French nationality and represents Morocco internationally, receiving his first call-up for the Morocco national football team in 2007.

References

External links

Official Superliga stats

1983 births
Living people
People from Meaux
FC Sochaux-Montbéliard players
IFK Norrköping players
Degerfors IF players
PFC CSKA Sofia players
Real Murcia players
Silkeborg IF players
Luzenac AP players
Wydad AC players
MC Oujda players
French footballers
Moroccan footballers
Morocco international footballers
2008 Africa Cup of Nations players
French sportspeople of Moroccan descent
First Professional Football League (Bulgaria) players
Ittihad Khemisset players
Association football midfielders
Superettan players
Footballers from Seine-et-Marne
Moroccan expatriate footballers
Moroccan expatriate sportspeople in Sweden
Moroccan expatriate sportspeople in Denmark
Moroccan expatriate sportspeople in Kuwait
French expatriate footballers
French expatriate sportspeople in Sweden
French expatriate sportspeople in Denmark
French expatriate sportspeople in Kuwait
Expatriate footballers in Sweden
Expatriate men's footballers in Denmark
Expatriate footballers in Kuwait
Expatriate footballers in Bulgaria
French expatriate sportspeople in Bulgaria
Moroccan expatriate sportspeople in Bulgaria
Expatriate footballers in Spain
French expatriate sportspeople in Spain
Moroccan expatriate sportspeople in Spain